Jay Olcutt Sanders (born April 16, 1953) is an American film, theatre and television actor and playwright. He frequently appears in plays off-Broadway at The Public Theatre.

Early life and education
Sanders was born on April 16, 1953 in Austin, Texas, to Phyllis Rae (née Aden) and James Olcutt Sanders. After attending the acting conservatory at SUNY Purchase, Sanders made his off-Broadway debut in a Shakespeare in the Park production of Henry V in 1976. He played Bradley in the first New York production of Sam Shepard's Buried Child in 1978.

Career
Sanders has had a long career in film and television. He is perhaps most recognized for his work in the films The Day After Tomorrow (2004), Green Lantern (2011) and Morgan Freeman Alex Cross films. He has appeared in many other notable films, including Glory (1989), Mr. Destiny, JFK (1991), Angels in the Outfield (1994), The Big Green (1995), Daylight,  Tumbleweeds (1999), Music of the Heart (1999), Half Nelson (2006), Cadillac Records (2008) and Revolutionary Road (2008).

On television, Sanders played mob lawyer Steven Kordo in the 1986–88 NBC detective series Crime Story, Norbert "Ziggy" Walsh on two episodes of Roseanne, and recurring characters on shows such as Person of Interest and True Detective. He is the narrator for the PBS series Wide Angle from 2002 to 2009, and has served as narrator for a number of Nova episodes starting in 2007.

On stage, Sanders has appeared on Broadway in Loose Ends (1979), The Caine Mutiny Court-Martial (1983), Saint Joan (1993), and Pygmalion (2007).

Off-Broadway, he appeared as George W. Bush in Sir David Hare's Stuff Happens in 2006. He then played in a number of Shakespearean plays: A Midsummer Night's Dream (Bottom, 2007), Hamlet (Ghost of Hamlet's Father/Player King/Gravedigger, 2008), Twelfth Night (as Sir Toby Belch, 2009), and the title role in Shakespeare's Titus Andronicus (2011).

Sanders appeared in the Richard Nelson Apple Family Plays, a series of plays that ran off-Broadway at the Public Theatre in 2010 (That Hopey Changey Thing), 2011 (Sweet and Sad), 2012 (Sorry), and 2013 (Regular Singing).

Sanders has appeared in more plays at the Delacorte Theatre (Shakespeare in Central Park) than any other actor to date.

Sanders' first play, Unexplored Interior, about the Rwandan genocide, debuted in November 2015 at the Atlas Performing Arts Center in Washington, D.C. Sanders had been working on it for more than a decade.

He received the 2018 Joe A. Callaway Award, presented by the Actors’ Equity Foundation for "best performance in a professional production of a classic play", for his performance in Chekhov's Uncle Vanya. He also received the Drama Desk Award for 2019 for Actor in a Play for Uncle Vanya.

Filmography

Film

Television

Video games

References

External links

Jay O. Sanders Audiography
eBooks and/or Audio Books by Jay O. Sanders

1953 births
20th-century American male actors
21st-century American dramatists and playwrights
21st-century American male actors
American male dramatists and playwrights
American male film actors
American male Shakespearean actors
American male stage actors
American male television actors
Audiobook narrators
Living people
Male actors from Austin, Texas
State University of New York at Purchase alumni
21st-century American male writers
Writers from Austin, Texas